The 100 seats in the United States Senate are divided into three classes for the purpose of determining which seats will be up for election in any two-year cycle, with only one class being up for election at a time. With senators being elected to fixed terms of six years, the classes allow about a third of the seats to be up for election in any presidential or midterm election year instead of having all 100 be up for election at the same time every six years. The seats are also divided in such a way that any given state's two senators are in different classes so that each seat's term ends in different years. Class 1and 2 consist of 33 seats each, while class3 consists of 34 seats. Elections for class1 seats are scheduled to take place in 2024, class2 in 2026, and the elections for class3 seats in 2028.

The three classes were established by ArticleI, Section 3, Clause2 of the U.S. Constitution. The actual division was originally performed by the Senate of the 1st Congress in May 1789 by lot. Whenever a new state subsequently joined the union, its two Senate seats were assigned to two different classes by a random draw, while keeping the three classes as close to the same number as possible.

The classes only apply to the regular fixed-term elections of the Senate. A special election to fill a vacancy, usually either due to the incumbent resigning or dying while in office, may happen in any given year regardless of the seat's class.

A senator's description as junior or senior senator is also not related to their class. Rather, a state's senior U.S. senator is the one with the greater seniority in the Senate, which is mostly based on length of service.

History

Constitutional footing
The U. S. Constitution sets the fixed term of senators to six years and staggers their elections into three cycles, so that a third of the Senate was up for election every two years. This allows at least some Senate elections to be held during any presidential or midterm election year, as the U.S. President is elected to a fixed term of four years and members of the U.S. House of Representatives are elected to fixed terms of two years. The objective is to promote stability in the Senate, and encourage senators to deliberate measures over time, rather than risk a rapid turnover of the entire chamber every six years. At the same time, it provided for more frequent elections as opposed to waiting every six years, to prevent senators from permanently combining for "sinister purposes".

The three classes of the Senate are specified by ArticleI, Section3 of the U.S. Constitution:

The allocation took place in May 1789, several weeks after the first Senate assembled. Only twenty senators from ten states were present; North Carolina and Rhode Island had not yet ratified the U.S. Constitution, and New York, because of its late ratification, had not yet selected its senators. To decide on how to implement the division into classes, on May 11 the Senate appointed a committee consisting of Senators Ellsworth, Carroll, and Few. In accordance with their recommendation, on May 14 the Senate divided the members into three classes:

On the next day, May 15, the term expiration of each class was determined by drawing lots. Lot 1 was drawn by Dalton, 2by Wingate, and 3by Langdon.

Upon the expiration of a senator's term of any length, someone starts a new six-year term as senator (based on election by the state legislatures until the Seventeenth Amendment required direct popular election of senators).

Addition of new states to the Union
When a new state is admitted to the Union, its two senators have terms that correspond to those of two different classes. Which two classes is determined by a scheme that keeps the three classes as close to the same size as possible; one that avoids the largest class differing by more than one senator from the smallest class. A random draw determines which new senator enters which of the classes selected to be expanded. This means at least one of any new state's first pair of senators has a term of more than two and up to six years, and the other has a term that is either two or four years shorter.

New York, which held its first Senate elections in July 1789, was the first state to undergo this process after the original May 1789 draw by the first Senate. Among the new senators, Philip Schuyler drew the lot for class1 (whose term would end in 1791) while Rufus King drew class3 (whose term would end in 1795). This made class1 have 8 senators while classes 2and 3 have 7 senators each. North Carolina was then assigned classes 2and 3 after holding its first Senate elections in November 1789, making all three classes have 8 seats each.

When the last state, Hawaii, was admitted in 1959, its first Senate elections had candidates run either for "seat A" or "seat B". The new senators Hiram Fong and Oren E. Long, in a process managed by the Secretary of the Senate, drew lots to determine which of the two would join the class1 (whose term would end in five-and-a-half years), and which would join class3 (whose term would end in three-and-a-half years).

Should a 51st state be admitted, it would receive senators in classes 1and 2, at which point all three classes would have 34 senators.

Because each state is represented by two senators, regardless of population, each class varies in electorate and populace. Since the early 19th century it so happens Class2 senators cumulatively co-represent 50–60% of the population; senators from each of the other two classes: 70–75% of the population of the United States. (Because each state has two senators, the sum total of these figures is 200%, not 100%.) Relatively populous states California, Florida, New York, Pennsylvania, and Ohio have their senators in classes 1and 3, provoking this imbalance.

The only times when both of a state's Senate seats could be up for election in the same year are when either a new state joins the union (as mentioned above), or when one of the seats is involved in a special election to fill a vacancy, usually either due to the incumbent resigning or dying while in office. A special election can be held during either presidential, midterm, or odd-numbered "off-year" elections regardless of the seat's class.

Class 1 

Class 1 consists of:
the 33 current senators whose seats are scheduled for re-election in November 2024, and whose terms end January 3, 2025; and
earlier senators with terms that ended in 1791, 1797, 1803, 1809, 1815, 1821, 1827, 1833, 1839, 1845, 1851, 1857, 1863, 1869, 1875, 1881, 1887, 1893, 1899, 1905, 1911, 1917, 1923, 1929, 1935, 1941, 1947, 1953, 1959, 1965, 1971, 1977, 1983, 1989, 1995, 2001, 2007, 2013, and 2019.
States with a class 1 senator: Arizona, California, Connecticut, Delaware, Florida, Hawaii, Indiana, Maine, Maryland, Massachusetts, Michigan, Minnesota, Mississippi, Missouri, Montana, Nebraska, Nevada, New Jersey, New Mexico, New York, North Dakota, Ohio, Pennsylvania, Rhode Island, Tennessee, Texas, Utah, Vermont, Virginia, Washington, West Virginia, Wisconsin, and Wyoming.

Class 2 

Class 2 consists of:
the 33 current senators whose seats are scheduled for re-election in November 2026, and whose terms end January 3, 2027; and
earlier senators with terms that ended in 1793, 1799, 1805, 1811, 1817, 1823, 1829, 1835, 1841, 1847, 1853, 1859, 1865, 1871, 1877, 1883, 1889, 1895, 1901, 1907, 1913, 1919, 1925, 1931, 1937, 1943, 1949, 1955, 1961, 1967, 1973, 1979, 1985, 1991, 1997, 2003, 2009, 2015, and 2021.
States with a class 2 senator: Alabama, Alaska, Arkansas, Colorado, Delaware, Georgia, Idaho, Illinois, Iowa, Kansas, Kentucky, Louisiana, Maine, Massachusetts, Michigan, Minnesota, Mississippi, Montana, Nebraska, New Hampshire, New Jersey, New Mexico, North Carolina, Oklahoma, Oregon, Rhode Island, South Carolina, South Dakota, Tennessee, Texas, Virginia, West Virginia, and Wyoming.

Class 3 

Class 3 consists of:
the 34 current senators whose seats are scheduled for re-election in November 2028, and whose terms end January 3, 2029; and
earlier senators with terms that ended in 1795, 1801, 1807, 1813, 1819, 1825, 1831, 1837, 1843, 1849, 1855, 1861, 1867, 1873, 1879, 1885, 1891, 1897, 1903, 1909, 1915, 1921, 1927, 1933, 1939, 1945, 1951, 1957, 1963, 1969, 1975, 1981, 1987, 1993, 1999, 2005, 2011, 2017, and 2023.
States with a class 3 senator: Alabama, Alaska, Arizona, Arkansas, California, Colorado, Connecticut, Florida, Georgia, Hawaii, Idaho, Illinois, Indiana, Iowa, Kansas, Kentucky, Louisiana, Maryland, Missouri, Nevada, New Hampshire, New York, North Carolina, North Dakota, Ohio, Oklahoma, Oregon, Pennsylvania, South Carolina, South Dakota, Utah, Vermont, Washington, and Wisconsin.

Election cycle years

This table is re-sorted every two years so that the next scheduled election year appears at the top.

Comparison with other U.S. general elections

List of current senators by class

The following table lists the senators by party by class.

The following table lists the senators by state and by class, including the states' Cook Partisan Voting Index ratings, which indicate the party direction in which a state tends to lean and the extent of that lean.

References

External links
United States Senate class page (old)
Current class 1, (senate.gov)
Current class 2, (senate.gov)
Current class 3, (senate.gov)
A 2013 analysis of the partisan leanings of each class

Classes
United States senators classes